Kodak Alaris is a British manufacturer and marketer of traditional photographic supplies (including film, paper, and processing chemicals), hardware and software for digital imaging and information management, and retail printing kiosks. The company is headquartered in Hemel Hempstead, Hertfordshire. The company shares ownership of the Kodak brand with the Eastman Kodak Company (usually known simply as Kodak).

History 
In 2012, Kodak filed for bankruptcy after a years-long decline in the company's core business related to film photography. As part of the bankruptcy, Kodak faced a $2.8 billion claim by the UK Kodak Pension Plan (KPP). The claim was resolved and Kodak Alaris was formed when KPP paid $325 million for Kodak's personalized imaging and document imaging businesses. KPP continues to control Kodak Alaris as a privately held company through Kodak Alaris Holdings Limited.

In 2014, the company appointed Ralf Gerbershagen as CEO. Also in 2014, Mark Elliott was named Chairman of the Board of Kodak Alaris.

In 2015, the company created AI Foundry, which provides business process automation solutions that use artificial intelligence (AI) and imaging science to automate data capture workflows.

In 2016, the company launched Kodak Moments, a visual storytelling app, at the South by Southwest festival.

In 2017, the company appointed Marc Jourlait as CEO, completed a balance sheet restructuring, renewed a rotating credit facility, and completed the sale of its manufacturing facility, Kodak Works in Harrow.

In 2018, the company's Information Management division announced that it would begin to operate under the name Alaris.

Current

Photographic film 
Kodak currently produces a wide range of photographic film in both 35mm and 120 film formats. The current film resurgence caused film shortages worldwide, increasing the price of current film stocks. Kodak has been actively hiring new employees since 2020, especially in film production, to meet the current market demand for films.

Color Reversal Film 

 Kodak Ektachrome E100

Color Negative Films 

 Kodak ProImage 100
 Kodak Ektar 100
 Kodak Gold 200
 Kodak Ultramax 400
 Kodak ColorPlus/Kodacolor 200
 Kodak Portra 160
 Kodak Portra 400
 Kodak Portra 800

Color Negative Industrial Film 

 Kodak Aerocolor IV 125

B&W Negative Films 

 Kodak Tri-X 320
 Kodak Tri-X 400
 Kodak TMAX 100
 Kodak TMAX 400
 Kodak TMAX P3200

In 2018, Kodak launched a newly formulated version of the iconic Kodak Ektachrome 100 color reversal film in 35mm film format. The following year, the company announced the film stock in 120mm and 4x5 film format. Due to its specific look, HBO shot the second season of the hit TV series Euphoria on Kodak Ektachrome with cinematographer Marcell Rév.

References

External links 
 

Companies based in Hemel Hempstead
Photography companies of the United Kingdom
Photographic film makers
Photography in the United Kingdom
Manufacturing companies established in 2013
Kodak